The Cleveland Squash Classic 2012 is the women's edition of the 2012 Cleveland Classic, which is a tournament of the WSA World Tour event International (Prize money: $50,000). The event took place at the Cleveland Racket Club in Cleveland, Ohio in United States from 29 January to 1 February. Nicol David won her first Cleveland Classic trophy, beating Laura Massaro in the final.

Prize money and ranking points
For 2012, the prize purse was $50,000. The prize money and points breakdown is as follows:

Seeds

Draw and results

See also
Cleveland Classic
WSA World Tour 2012
2012 Women's British Open Squash Championship

References

External links
WSA Cleveland Classic 2012 website
Cleveland Classic 2012 Squashsite website

Women's Cleveland Classic
Women's Cleveland Classic
2012 in American sports
Cleveland Classic